Abbas Kaijuka is a Ugandan fashion designer, stylist and fashion collector known for his brand Kai's Divo. 
He is a recipient of the East Africa’s Male Fashion Designer of the Year award at the 2020 East Africa Fashion Awards and the Fashion Designer of the Year award at the 2016 Abryanz Style & Fashion Awards and received various nominations including the East African Designer of the year award at the 2017 Swahili Fashion Week.

Awards and nominations

References

1989 births
Living people
Ugandan fashion designers
Fashion stylists